The English and German national football teams have played each other since the end of the 19th century, and officially since 1930. The teams met for the first time in November 1899, when England beat Germany in four straight matches. Notable matches between England and Germany (or West Germany) include the 1966 FIFA World Cup Final, and the semi-finals of the 1990 FIFA World Cup and UEFA Euro 1996 and the round of sixteen of the 2010 FIFA World Cup and UEFA Euro 2020. While the English public, football fans and in particular newspapers consider an England–Germany football rivalry to have developed, it is mostly an English phenomenon since most German fans consider the Netherlands or Italy to be their traditional footballing rivals.

England player and broadcaster Gary Lineker notoriously said "Football is a simple game; 22 men chase a ball for 90 minutes and at the end, the Germans win." He would paraphrase himself following the final of the UEFA Women's Euro 2022, saying: "Football is a simple game. 22 women chase a ball for 90 minutes and, at the end, England actually win."

In this article, references to the German football team include the former West Germany football team before German reunification.

History

Early encounters

The Football Association (FA) instigated a four-game tour of Germany and Austria by a representative England team in November 1899. The England team played a representative German team in Berlin on 23 November 1899, with the German side losing 1-0. Two days later a slightly altered German side lost 10–2. The third and fourth matches were played in Prague and Karlsruhe against a combined Austrian and German side, and England won 6–0 and 7–0. Those games cannot be considered as "official" and are known as "proto-international matches" (Ur-Länderspiele) in Germany because they were organised by a regional federation from Berlin and the German Football Association (DFB) was not founded until 28 January 1900. On the other hand, the DFB considers four matches played between 1908-1913 against the England national amateur football team of the FA as official matches against England, while the FA does not.

The first ever full international between the two teams was a friendly match played on Saturday 10 May 1930, in Berlin. England were 1–0 and 2–1 up in the game, but after losing a player to injury went behind 3–2, before a late goal from David Jack brought the score to 3–3, which was how the game finished.

The next match between the two teams was played on 4 December 1935, at White Hart Lane in London, the first full international to take place between the teams in England and the first since the rise to power of Adolf Hitler and the Nazis in 1933. It was also the first match to stir up particular controversy, as The Observer newspaper reported protests by the British Trades Union Congress that the game could be used as a propaganda event by the Nazi regime. "No recent sporting event has been treated with such high seriousness in Germany as this match ... Between 7,500 and 8,000 Germans will travel via Dover, and special trains will bring them to London. A description broadcast throughout Germany ... Sir Walter Citrine, General Secretary of the TUC, in a further letter to Sir John Simon, the Home Secretary, said that 'such a large and carefully organised Nazi contingent coming to London might confirm the impression among people in this country that the event is being regarded as of some political importance by the visitors'."

Of the match itself, however, which England won 3–0, the same newspaper reported the following week that: "So chivalrous in heart and so fair in tackling were the English and German teams who played at Tottenham in mid-week that even the oldest of veterans failed to recall an international engagement played with such good manners by everybody."

The next game between the two teams, and the last to be played before the Second World War, was again in Germany, a friendly at the Olympic Stadium in Berlin on 14 May 1938, played in front of a crowd of 110,000 people. It was the last time England played against a unified German team until the 1990s. This was the most controversial of all the early encounters between the two teams, as before kick-off the English players were ordered by the Foreign Office to line up and perform a Nazi salute in respect to their hosts. How compliant the players were with this situation has been a matter of debate, with a feature in The Observer in 2001 speculating that they were "perhaps merely indifferent players (who had undoubtedly become more reluctant, to the point of mutiny, by the time the post-war memoirs were published)."

A BBC News Online report published in 2003 reported that the salute was calculated to show: "that Germany, which two months earlier had annexed Austria, was not a pariah state. The friendly game effectively helped clear the way for Chamberlain's "Peace for our time" deal with Hitler, which, in turn, led to Germany's invasion of Czechoslovakia." England won the match 6–3, but according to German writer Ulrich Linder, author of the book Strikers for Hitler: "To lose to England at the time was nothing unusual because basically everybody lost to [them] at the time. For Hitler,  the propaganda effect of that game was more important than anything else."

The two countries did not meet again on a football pitch for sixteen years. Two German states had been founded in 1949, with the Germany national football team continuing its tradition, based in the Federal Republic of Germany (West Germany) from 1949 to 1990. The German Democratic Republic (East Germany) fielded a separate national football team; although the English did play some matches against them, the rivalry never developed the same edge or high-profile. A third German team, Saarland, also briefly existed between 1950 and 1956. However they never played a match against England.

In a friendly at Wembley Stadium on 1 December 1954, England won 3–1 against an under-strength West German side, who were at the time the champions of the world, having won the 1954 FIFA World Cup. England won further friendlies against West Germany in 1956 (3–1 at the Olympic Stadium in Berlin) and 1965 (1–0 in Nuremberg).

1966–1969: 1966 FIFA World Cup

England and West Germany met at Wembley again on 23 February 1966, as part of their preparations for the 1966 FIFA World Cup, which was to be held in England. England again won 1–0, with a goal from Nobby Stiles, and the match also saw the first appearance for England of West Ham United striker Geoff Hurst.

Both countries had a successful World Cup in 1966, and met in the final played at Wembley on Saturday, 30 July 1966. This was and still is regarded by many as the most important match ever played between the two teams, and it was also the first time they had ever met in a competitive game, as opposed to the friendly matches they had played before. It was also a highly eventful and in some respects controversial game, which created the modern rivalry between the teams.

England led 2–1 until the very end of normal time, when a West German goal levelled the scores and took the match into extra time. In the first period of extra time, England striker Geoff Hurst had a shot on goal which bounced down from the crossbar and then out of the goal, before being cleared away by the West German defenders. The England players celebrated a goal, but the referee was unsure as to whether or not the ball had crossed the line when it hit the ground. After consulting with a linesman, Tofiq Bahramov, the referee awarded a goal to England. Bahramov, from the Soviet Union, became famous and celebrated in English popular culture as "the Russian linesman", although he was actually from Azerbaijan. When England played the Azerbaijan national team in a World Cup qualifier in October 2004—in a stadium named after Bahramov—many England fans travelling to the game asked to be shown the grave of the official, who had died in 1993, so that they could place flowers on it, and before the game a ceremony honouring him was attended by Hurst and other footballing celebrities.

West Germany, however, did not believe that the ball had crossed the line, with commentators such as Robert Becker of Kicker magazine accusing the linesman of bias because the West German team had eliminated the USSR in the semi-final. Modern studies using film analysis and computer simulation have suggested the ball never crossed the line – both Duncan Gillies of the Visual Information Processing Group at Imperial College London and Ian Reid and Andrew Zisserman of the Department of Engineering Science at University of Oxford agree that the ball would have needed to travel a further 2.5–6 cm to fully cross the line, and that therefore this was not a fair goal. In West Germany,  it led to the creation of the expression "Wembley-Tor", or "Wembley-Goal", a phrase used to describe any goal scored in a similar fashion to Hurst's.

England, however, scored another controversial goal at the end of extra time, winning 4–2. This goal came after fans began to spill onto the field, thinking the game was over, which should have stopped play. The goal, a third for Hurst (making him the only man ever to score a hat-trick in a World Cup final until Kylian Mbappe in 2022), was described by BBC Television commentator Kenneth Wolstenholme in a now-famous piece of commentary, "They think it's all over... it is now!", referring to the English fans who had spilled onto the field. The expression has become a celebrated part of English popular culture, indelibly linked with the game in the minds of the English public.

The 1966 final's influence on the culture surrounding the England team would not end there, however. Despite playing on their home soil, England wore their away kit of red shirts, white shorts and red socks, and since then England fans have had a special affinity for their team's away kit, with retro 1966 shirts selling well in recent years.

The game is often held as having been the height of English sporting achievement, it has also created some favourable legacies; a common chant among England supporters at Germany games is "Two World Wars and One World Cup" to the tune of "Camptown Races".

Two years after the World Cup, on 1 June 1968, the two teams met again in another friendly match, this time in West Germany, in which the West Germans won their first victory over an English team, 38 years after they had first played. The scoreline was 1–0, Franz Beckenbauer scoring for West Germany, but as Hugh McIlvanney wrote in his match report for The Observer: "Comparing this miserable hour and a half (in which fouls far outnumbered examples of creative football) with the last great meeting between the countries is entirely fatuous. But that will not prevent the West Germans from doing it. Their celebrations will not be inhibited by the knowledge that today's losers were almost a reserve team, and even the agonies of boredom they shared with us will now seem worthwhile. They have beaten England, and that is enough."

1970–89: 1970 FIFA World Cup
Far more noted and remembered, however, was the next competitive meeting between the two teams, in the quarter-finals of the 1970 FIFA World Cup in Mexico. England were 2–0 up, but Beckenbauer and Uwe Seeler equalised at 2–2 in the second half. In extra time, Geoff Hurst had a goal mysteriously ruled out and then Gerd Müller scored in extra time to win 3–2. England had been weakened by losing their goalkeeper Gordon Banks to illness, and also substituted Bobby Charlton, one of their leading players, while the Germans were in the midst of their comeback. As McIlvanney put it when reflecting on the loss five days later, "Sir Alf Ramsey's team are out because the best goalkeeper most people have ever seen turned sick, and one who is only slightly less gifted was overwhelmed by the suddenness of his promotion. In sport disaster often feeds upon itself but this was a sickeningly gluttonous example."

The result was psychologically damaging for English morale—as The Guardian newspaper described in a 2006 feature: "Four days later Harold Wilson blamed Labour's loss in the general election on the defeat. This marked the start of two decades of German footballing dominance and England's decline."

Two years later the teams met once more, in the quarter-finals of the European Championship, which were at the time held on a home-and-away basis. England lost 3–1 at Wembley on 29 April 1972 in the home leg, and on 13 May could only draw 0–0 in West Germany, being knocked out of the competition. Said The Observer in 2001: "England may have been robbed of the chance in Mexico ... but there were no shortage of excuses – the heat, the hostile crowd, the food which had felled Banks, the errors of Bonetti ... It was a conspiracy of fate more than a footballing defeat. In 1972, there were no excuses at all. West Germany did not just knock England out of the European Championships, they came to Wembley and comprehensively outclassed England." McIlvanney wrote in his match report for The Observer: "No Englishman can ever again warm himself with the old assumption that, on the football field if nowhere else, the Germans are an inferior race."

1990–99: 1990 FIFA World Cup and UEFA Euro 1996
There were several friendly games played in the 1970s and 1980s, with wins for both nations, but the next competitive match—a second round group game at the 1982 FIFA World Cup—ended in a disappointing 0–0 draw. England were later eliminated from that competition after drawing Spain 0-0, while Germany reached the final. However, when the teams next met competitively, at the 1990 FIFA World Cup, it was a rather more dramatic and eventful clash in the semi-finals, the first time England had reached that far in the competition since their win in 1966.

In summer 1990, the process of German reunification had advanced far, with the Deutsche Mark being introduced in the East two days before the semifinals on 3 July. Unlike in previous decades, East German fans could openly support the German team of the DFB which by then had an 80+ year tradition.

The England team had started the event poorly and had not been expected to reach that stage of the competition, but in the game they could match the stronger German team, managed by Franz Beckenbauer. The Germans took the lead in the 59th minute when a free-kick from Andreas Brehme deflected off Paul Parker and over goalkeeper Peter Shilton. Gary Lineker equalised in the 80th minute, and then David Platt had a goal ruled out in extra time. The result was thus decided by a penalty shoot-out—the England team's first—which West Germany won 4–3 after misses from Stuart Pearce and Chris Waddle. England would lose to host nation Italy for the third-place consolation match, whilst West Germany defeated Argentina in the final.

The match stayed heavily in the English popular consciousness — not simply for the football and the dramatic manner of the defeat, but also for the reaction of star player Paul Gascoigne to receiving a yellow card. His second of the tournament, his realisation that this would see him suspended for the final should England make it prompted him to burst into tears on the pitch. Said The Observer in 2004, "There are half a dozen images that define this decade of change, which help to show why football widened its appeal. First, and most important, is the sight of Paul Gascoigne crying into his England shirt after being booked in the 1990 World Cup semi-final against West Germany. Unaggressive and emotional, a billboard image that helped to start an apparently unstoppable surge in popularity for the national team."

Despite this rehabilitation of the image of football aided by the English national team's success in the 1990 tournament, the narrow defeat by Germany helped to increase the antipathy felt towards the German team and the German nation in general. Mark Perryman wrote in 2006: "How could we expect to beat mighty (West) Germany, who had only narrowly lost the final four years previously? To my mind it is the fact that we so nearly did, then lost in the penalty shoot-out that explains the past 16 years of an increasingly bitter rivalry."

Germany was reunited in October 1990. For the DFB team, few things changed apart from players previously capped for East Germany becoming eligible for the united German team. This made little difference to the tone and emotion of the rivalry.

England's first match against the unified Germany since 1938 was a friendly in 1991 at Wembley, which the Germans won 1–0. Five years later, at the 1996 European Championships, England played a unified German team for the first time in a competitive fixture, when they met in the semi-finals. Like the 1966 World Cup, the tournament was being held in England, and the semi-final was played at Wembley Stadium. England's fans and team were confident, particularly after wins in the group stage over Scotland (2–0) and the Netherlands (4–1) and their first ever penalty shoot-out victory, over Spain, in the quarter-finals. So vivid were the memories of 1966 for England fans that a media clamour ensued for England to wear red jerseys, instead of the unfamiliar-looking grey away kit that had been launched earlier that year (as England had not submitted details of any red kit to UEFA before the tournament, this was never going to be permitted, and England did wear grey).

The build-up to the game was soured, however, by headlines in English tabloid newspapers which were regarded by many as overly nationalistic, and even racist in tone, as they had also been before the previous match against Spain. Particularly controversial was the Daily Mirror'''s headline "Achtung! Surrender! For You Fritz, ze Euro 96 Championship is over", accompanied by a mock article aping a report of the declaration of war between the two nations in 1939. The editor of the paper, Piers Morgan, subsequently apologised for the headline, particularly as it was at least partially blamed for violence following England's defeat, including a riot in Trafalgar Square.

England took the lead in only the third minute, through tournament top scorer Alan Shearer, but in the 16th minute Stefan Kuntz equalised, and despite many close shots and a disallowed goal from the Germans, the score remained level at 1–1 until the end of extra time. The match was settled by another penalty shoot-out, as in 1990, and although this time all five of England's initial penalty-takers were successful, so were all five German players. The shoot-out carried on to "sudden death" kicks, with Gareth Southgate missing for England and Andreas Möller scoring for Germany to put the hosts out. As in 1990, Germany went on to win the tournament.

Also the FA cancelled a friendly with Germany as it was pencilled for 20 April 1994 as it coincided with Hitler's 105th would-be birthday and played at the Berlin Olympic Stadium, the venue for the controversial and Nazi-politicized 1936 Summer Olympics.

2000–09: 2002 FIFA World Cup qualifier

England and Germany were drawn to meet each other in the first round group stage of the Euro 2000, held jointly by Belgium and the Netherlands, with the England–Germany game taking place in Charleroi in Belgium. Before the game, played on 17 June 2000, there were violent incidents involving England fans in the town centre, although these were mostly brief and there were no violent confrontations with German fans. Nonetheless, reporting of the violence did to a degree overshadow the match result in some media coverage.

The match itself was a scrappy affair that lacked the drama of many of the previous encounters, with England sneaking a 1–0 win thanks to a second-half header by striker Alan Shearer. There was enthusiastic celebration of this result in England, particularly as this was the first time that England had won a competitive match against Germany since the 1966 World Cup final. The German reaction was more pessimistic. Rounding up the German media coverage, The Guardian reported: "'0–1! Germany weeps. Is it all over?' asked the mass circulation Bild newspaper in a front-page banner headline. 'Shearer tells us to pack our bags,' wrote Berlin's Der Tagesspiegel."

In the event, both England and Germany lost their final group matches and both were knocked out in the first round, finishing third and fourth respectively in their group, which was the worst German result in a tournament since the 1938 World Cup, while England had already experienced that multiple times in the two previous decades.

England and Germany had also been drawn together in the same qualifying group for the 2002 FIFA World Cup. England's home match against Germany was played on Saturday 7 October 2000, and was significant as it was the last international fixture ever to be played at the old Wembley Stadium, before it was demolished and rebuilt. England lost 1–0 to a German free kick scored by Dietmar Hamann. "It was the last refuge of the inadequate. Half-time neared, England were a goal down and a sizeable section of the crowd sullied the ever-dampening occasion. 'Stand up if you won the War,' they sang", wrote journalist Ian Ridley in his match report for The Observer.

The result prompted the immediate resignation of England manager Kevin Keegan, and by the time the return match was played at the Olympic Stadium in Munich on 1 September 2001, England were now managed by their first ever foreign coach, Sven-Göran Eriksson. Expectations on the English side were low, but they surprisingly won the game 5–1 with a hat-trick from striker Michael Owen, and eventually qualified for the World Cup as the winners of their group. During the game the father of German coach Rudi Völler suffered a heart attack inside the stadium, but was successfully resuscitated.

Some Germans were shocked by the scale of the defeat, with former striker Karl-Heinz Rummenigge stating that "I have never seen such a terrible defeat ... This is a new Waterloo for us."

At the 2002 World Cup finals in Japan and South Korea, it was Germany who enjoyed more success, finishing second. England only reached the quarter-finals. Both teams were defeated by the competition winners, Brazil.

The two teams did not meet in Euro 2004, 2006 World Cup or Euro 2008. (Germany suffered a second consecutive group elimination in 2004, England avoided a showdown with Germany in the last 16 by holding Sweden to a draw and finishing at the top of their group, and England did not qualify for Euro 2008).

England and Germany next played on 22 August 2007, in a friendly at the newly-rebuilt Wembley Stadium. England lost the match 2–1, their first defeat at the new Wembley, with Germany, following the unexpectedly successful 2006 World Cup, still rebuilding the national team. Then in a friendly held on 19 November 2008, England inflicted Germany's first defeat in Berlin in thirty-five years with a 2–1 victory.

2010–2019: 2010 FIFA World Cup
In the 2010 FIFA World Cup, the two teams met in the second round on Sunday, 27 June, after Germany won Group D and England finished second in Group C.

Germany won the match 4–1, knocking England out and advancing into the quarter-finals. This was the greatest defeat England ever suffered in their World Cup history. In the 38th minute, a shot by Frank Lampard controversially bounced off the crossbar well into the goal and back out again with Germany leading only 2–1. However, neither the referee Jorge Larrionda nor the linesman saw it pass over the line.

The decision drew immediate comparisons with Geoff Hurst's so-called "Wembley Goal" during the 1966 World Cup Final. However, in the 2010 case there was no dispute about whether the ball had crossed the goal line, because the ball had clearly touched the grass well within the goal, and the television replay immediately showed this. In Germany, it was regarded as "payback" for the goal of 1966.

Following Germany's 1–0 win over England at Wembley in November 2013, German tabloid Bild humorously declared on its front cover that "Wembley is now German".

2020–present: UEFA Euro 2020 and beyond
On 29 June 2021, England won their encounter in the UEFA Euro 2020 round of 16 match 2–0, their first win over Germany in a knockout stage of a tournament and also England's first competitive victory on home soil against Germany since the 1966 World Cup final. This is also Germany’s second defeat in the round of 16 of a major tournament after the 1938 FIFA World Cup.

Comparison of England and Germany in major international tournaments
{| class="wikitable" style="text-align: center;"
|-
! Tournament
!! width=50|
!! width=80|
!! width=500|Notes
|-
|1930 FIFA World Cup
| rowspan="3" |DNP|DNP
|
|-
|1934 FIFA World Cup
| style="background:#def;"|3
|
|-
|1938 FIFA World Cup
| style="background:#def;"|9–16
|German team included Austrian players as a result of the Anschluss.
|-
|1950 FIFA World Cup
| style="background:#def;"|5–13
|DNP
| German teams were still banned as a result of World War II.
|-
|1954 FIFA World Cup
|5–8
| style="background:#def;"|1
|First tournament where only West Germany was represented.
|-
|1958 FIFA World Cup
|9–16
| style="background:#def;"|4
|
|-
|UEFA Euro 1960
| colspan="2" |DNP
|
|-
|1962 FIFA World Cup
| colspan="2" |5–8
|
|-
|UEFA Euro 1964
|FTQ
|DNP
|
|-
|1966 FIFA World Cup
| style="background:#def;"|1
|2
|In the final, England defeated West Germany 4–2 after extra time.
|-
|UEFA Euro 1968
| style="background:#def;"|3
|FTQ
|
|-
|1970 FIFA World Cup
|5–8
| style="background:#def;"|3
|In the quarter-finals, West Germany defeated England 3–2 after extra time.
|-
|UEFA Euro 1972
|FTQ (5–8)
| style="background:#def;"|1
|In the final qualifying round (effectively a quarter-final) West Germany defeated England 3–1 on aggregate.
|-
|1974 FIFA World Cup
| rowspan="3" |FTQ
| style="background:#def;"|1
|This tournament is the only World Cup or European Championship where East Germany qualified.
|-
|UEFA Euro 1976
| style="background:#def;"|2
|
|-
|1978 FIFA World Cup
| style="background:#def;"|5–8
|
|-
|UEFA Euro 1980
|5–8
| style="background:#def;"|1
|
|-
|1982 FIFA World Cup
|5–12
| style="background:#def;"|2
|In the second group stage, West Germany drew 0–0 with England.  
|-
|UEFA Euro 1984
|FTQ
| style="background:#def;"|5–8
|
|-
|1986 FIFA World Cup
|5–8
| style="background:#def;"|2
|
|-
|UEFA Euro 1988
|5–8
| style="background:#def;"|3–4
|
|-
|1990 FIFA World Cup
|4
| style="background:#def;"|1
|In the semi-finals, West Germany defeated England on penalty shoot-out.
|-
|UEFA Euro 1992
|5–8
| style="background:#def;"|2
|First tournament since World War II where all of Germany was represented by one team
|-
|1994 FIFA World Cup
|FTQ
| style="background:#def;"|5–8
|
|-
|UEFA Euro 1996
|3–4
| style="background:#def;"|1
|In the semi-finals, Germany defeated England on penalty shoot-out.
|-
|1998 FIFA World Cup
|9–16
| style="background:#def;"|5–8
|
|-
|UEFA Euro 2000
| style="background:#def;"|9–16
|9–16
|England and Germany were placed in the same first round group. Both were eliminated, with England finishing third and Germany fourth. England defeated Germany 1–0 in the match between the two teams.
|-
|2002 FIFA World Cup
|5–8
| style="background:#def;"|2
|England and Germany were placed in the same qualifying group. Germany won 1–0 at Wembley, while England won 5–1 in Munich.
|-
|UEFA Euro 2004
| style="background:#def;"|5–8
|9–16
|
|-
|2006 FIFA World Cup
|5–8
| style="background:#def;"|3
|
|-
|UEFA Euro 2008
|FTQ
| style="background:#def;"|2
|
|-
|2010 FIFA World Cup
|9–16
| style="background:#def;"|3
|In the round of 16, Germany defeated England 4–1.
|-
|UEFA Euro 2012
|5–8
| style="background:#def;"|3
|
|-
|2014 FIFA World Cup
|17–32
| style="background:#def;"|1
|
|-
|UEFA Euro 2016
|9–16
| style="background:#def;"|3–4
|England infamously lost in the round of 16 to Iceland.
|-
|2018 FIFA World Cup
| style="background:#def;"| 4
| 17–32
|Germany were eliminated in the first round of a FIFA World Cup for the first time since 1938.
|-
|UEFA Euro 2020
| style="background:#def;"|2
| 9–16
| In the round of 16, England defeated Germany 2–0.
|-
|2022 FIFA World Cup
| style="background:#def;"| 5-8
| 17–32
|Germany were eliminated in the first round for a second consecutive tournament.
|}

Women's football

Club football
The German women's league is considered one of the strongest in the world. By the end of the 2021–22, German clubs had won nine Champions League titles, while an English club had won the competition on only one occasion (Arsenal in 2007).

National teams
The German women's team was generally more popular in Germany than the English women's team is in England. Germany matches were televised on national television and attracted millions of viewers. The World Cup 2011 quarterfinal between Germany and Japan attracted over 17 million viewers, while England women's matches struggled to even make it into television schedules.

England's group games in the World Cup 2011 were watched by up to four million viewers on German television, but less than a million on BBC, which means even with no German involvement, England games were at that point more popular in Germany than in the country the England team actually represents. Observers noted that this gap in popularity was not just due to a lack of gender equality in England, but to the fact that the success of the German women's team meant that there was much more media coverage and interest.

England had not won a major title until they won Euro 2022, their best result beforehand being Euro runners up in women's Euro 1984 and in Euro 2009. Meanwhile, Germany's women have won two World Cups, 2003 and 2007, a total of eight European Championships in the years of 1989, 1991, 1995, 1997, 2001, 2005, 2009 and 2013 and the 2016 Summer Olympics.

Germany is the only nation to have won both the men's and women's FIFA World Cup, and the only women’s team to win the European Championship a year after the men’s team won (in 1996 and 1997). Together with the three Euro wins and the four World Cup wins of the men's team, Germany counts 18 major tournament titles, while England has two major tournament titles so far. On 4 July 2015, England upset Germany 1–0 in the third place match at the 2015 FIFA Women's World Cup; this was their first ever victory against Germany in 21 matches. The two sides met in the 2022 Arnold Clark Cup, when England won 3–1 at Molineux Stadium, and the UEFA Women's Euro 2022 Final at Wembley Stadium, with England won 2–1 to secure their first ever major title.

Media and public reactions

England

Since World War II, England has considered itself a rival to Germany in many areas, such as automobile production, naval forces, trade and economy—this rivalry has also permeated into football.

English football fans often deem Germany to be their traditional football rival and care more about this rivalry than those with other countries, such as Scotland, Argentina or even Australia. In the run-up to any football match against Germany, many English tabloids publish articles that contain references to the Second World War, such as calling their opposition derogatory terms such as "krauts" or "hun".

Two days before the UEFA Euro 1996 semifinal, The Daily Mirror published an article on its front page that ran with the headline "Achtung! Surrender!": another reference to the war. After the 5–1 victory over Germany in 2001, the English news media were ecstatic. The Sunday Mirror drew more comparisons to World War II, by running an article about the game on the front page under the headline "BLITZED".

England's defeat of Germany in the 1966 World Cup has been often voted by the English as their greatest ever sporting moment, and the 5–1 victory in 2001 has also regularly placed highly. England's Manchester United defeating Germany's Bayern Munich at the 1999 UEFA Champions League Final is also highly regarded by English football fans as a high point in their perceived rivalry. The rivalry has also made its way into various aspects of English popular culture. For example, in the 1970s BBC television series Whatever Happened to the Likely Lads?, the character Terry remarks that 14 June 1970, the day that England lost 3–2 to West Germany, should be "indelibly printed on every true Englishman's mind".

Germany
As far back as the 1960s, the footballing rivalry between England and Germany has been considered mainly an English phenomenon; this has been observed by several commentators of both English and German origin. In June 2009, British comedian Stephen Fry stated on the BBC show QI that, unlike the English, German football fans do not care about their team's loss at the 1966 World Cup final and may not even remember that they had made it that far. Instead, German fans consider their rivalry with the Netherlands to be their traditional footballing rivalry and care more about the matches against them, such as the 1974 FIFA World Cup final.

Following their 5–1 loss in 2001, many German fans were not particularly concerned, instead revelling in the Netherlands' defeat by the Republic of Ireland the same day. Some sang directly after the loss to England: "Ohne Holland fahr'n wir zur WM" ("We're going to the World Cup without Holland!"), which was eventually made into a german Schlager song.

In 2010, during the lead-up to 2010 World Cup match, journalist Marina Hyde remarked in The Guardian that the rivalry between the England and Germany football teams was "quite obviously an illusion, existing only in the minds of those wishful to the point of insanity – which is to say, the English". She added: "In a world that has changed bewilderingly in recent decades, England losing to Germany in major tournaments is one of the few certainties." Similarly, professor Peter J. Beck described Germany's ambivalence to the rivalry, saying that "as far as the Germans are concerned, Sunday's game is nothing more than another sporting contest".

However, it would also be false to say that there is no rivalry at all between England and Germany; for one thing, the very fact that the English perceive it to be such cannot go unnoticed, for another, there is the long-standing quarrel about the "Wembley goal" (only somewhat silenced since a clear goal was not awarded to the English in 2010). England vs. Germany matches, even friendlies, are always considered highly important sporting events (though the tradition and, usually, the quality of both the teams may account for most of that), going so far that a popular radioplay series mocks people in love as "looking deep into each other's eyes even if a England vs. Germany match is on TV". However, any feeling of rivalry towards England, if existent, is dwarfed by the German-Dutch rivalry.

List of matches

Unofficial internationals
English teams played a number of games against German teams between 1899 and 1911. The first of these, encompassing an official Football Association tour of Germany and Austria in 1899, and a reciprocal tour of England by a German select squad, saw the English teams feature a mix of amateurs and professionals playing against German sides organised by regional associations, even after the foundation of the DFB in 1901. The games played between 1908 and 1913 saw the official German national team, organised by the DFB, play against the England Amateur side.

Note that matches 6–9 Germany awarded caps against the England amateur team.

Full internationals

Overview

* Euro and World Cup matchups include qualifiers.* PSO = penalty shoot-outs

Matches

Note: Since 1908, Germany is represented by the German Football Association (DFB) which fields the Germany national football team. During German division (1949–1990), the team of the German Football Association based in Frankfurt, Federal Republic of Germany was colloquially called West Germany.

East German national team
England played four friendly matches against East Germany's team, which was fielded by the DFV in the German Democratic Republic which existed from 1949 to 1990:
Overview:

Club level

As well as the rivalry between the national sides, English and German club teams have also met on numerous occasions in the various European club competitions.

On 19 May 2012, Bayern Munich met Chelsea in the 2012 UEFA Champions League Final. Having recently missed out on the Bundesliga title to their rivals Borussia Dortmund, Bayern Munich suffered defeat at the Allianz Arena; a game dubbed "Finale dahoam"  (Bavarian for "final at home") as it marked the second time that any team played the tournament's final at their home ground. 
The game ended as a 1–1 draw after added extra time (aet) before being decided 4–3 on penalties. Bayern Munich seemed like the more dominant of the two sides throughout, but an overtly defensive Chelsea team "parked the bus", preventing many chances which eventually led them to their first Champions League win.

In the memorable 1999 UEFA Champions League Final between Manchester United and Bayern Munich, United were trailing 1–0 until they scored two late goals in injury time to win 2–1. Other memorable matches were the controversial 1975 European Cup Final in which Bayern beat Leeds United after the latter had penalty claims turned down by a French referee who also disallowed a goal scored by Peter Lorimer with a shot from outside the area. Leeds would eventually eliminate a German team (VfB Stuttgart) in unexpected and bizarre circumstances. After the Germans had qualified, in the first round of the 1992–93 UEFA Champions League, on the away goals rule, the return leg was awarded by UEFA 3–0 to Leeds United because Stuttgart fielded an extra foreigner, thus infringing the European competition rules that were in place at the time. A replay was ordered as the aggregate stood at 3–3. Leeds won the replay at Barcelona's Camp Nou 2–1.

In 2000, a young and depleted Leeds United side, managed by David O'Leary, eliminated 1860 Munich from the Champions League beating them home and away in the preliminary round before reaching the semi-final. There were also famous wins by Liverpool, Nottingham Forest and Aston Villa in European Cup semifinals or finals. These were against the likes of Borussia Mönchengladbach, 1. FC Köln, Hamburg and Bayern Munich. Liverpool's win against Borussia Mönchengladbach in Rome started a sequence of six consecutive English European Cup victories each time involving the elimination of a German club in the latter stages.

The English hold the upper hand in club football encounters, although there were notable German wins such as Bayern's revenge over Manchester United F.C. in 2001, winning home and away, and Bayer 04 Leverkusen's elimination of Liverpool (a rarity for German club sides) and Manchester United in 2002, after they had received a 4–1 drubbing at Arsenal (the Gunners – who boast the best English record against Italian sides in the three European competitions – have an unimpressive record against German opposition) in the second group phase. Both English sides exacted revenge over Leverkusen in subsequent Champions League encounters. Borussia Dortmund beat Manchester United 1–0 both home and away in the semifinal of the 1996–97 UEFA Champions League which they won, United having been guilty of squandering numerous chances in both legs, especially the return leg at Old Trafford.

English club victories were often celebrated in a manner which evoked memories of the War. The outspoken Brian Clough is on record boasting that he never lost to a German side and that he took satisfaction from this for what the Germans had done to his father during the war. Clough memorably led Nottingham Forest to a 1–0 win in Cologne following a 3–3 draw at the City Ground in the 1979 semifinal en route to Forest winning their first European Cup. The following year, a Forest side minus star player, Trevor Francis, defeated Hamburg in the final by employing an Italian style catenaccio based on dogged defence and brilliant goalkeeping by Peter Shilton. One other famous manager who never tasted defeat against the Germans was Bob Paisley who led Liverpool to three of their five European Cup wins and one of their two UEFA Cup wins. Liverpool have a tremendous record against German opposition, from both sides of the East-West divide. They once beat 1860 Munich 8–0 in an old Fairs Cup game and also thrashed Hamburg 6–0 when winning the first of their three European Super Cups, the second also against German opposition in the form of FC Bayern Munich.

Liverpool's encounters with Bayern and Borussia Mönchengladbach (known in Germany as the Gladbacher), the latter a force to be reckoned with in the 1970s, are memorable. Bayern and Liverpool first met in the Fairs Cup (the forerunner to the UEFA Cup) in 1970–71. Bayern had hit Coventry City for six in a previous round. Liverpool won the first leg 3–0 with an Alun Evans hat-trick and drew 1–1 in Munich. This was the Bayern team of Franz Beckenbauer, Maier, Gerd Müller, Schwarzenbeck and Breitner who turned the tables on Liverpool the following year in a UEFA Cup Winners' Cup second round tie, drawing at Anfield and winning 3–1 at home. The most important encounter between the two sides was in the European Cup semi-final of 1981 when a depleted Liverpool were held to a goalless draw at Anfield and then drew 1–1 in Munich. They scored in the 83rd minute with a Ray Kennedy goal at the Olympiastadion in Munich before Karl-Heinz Rummenigge equalised in the 88th minute to preserve Bayern's then unbeaten home record against English opposition, even though Liverpool went through to win their third European Cup final. The two sides met again in the 2001 UEFA Super Cup when Liverpool, managed by Gérard Houllier, stormed to a three-goal lead before Bayern scored twice towards the end to make it 3–2.

Apart from the 1977 European Cup final, Liverpool beat Mönchengladbach in the 1970–1971 European Cup competition, in the 1973 UEFA Cup Final and the 1978 European Cup semi-final. Günter Netzer and midfield forager, Herbert Wimmer, played for Mönchengladbach in the 1973 Cup final against Liverpool, then managed by Bill Shankly. That year Liverpool won the UEFA Cup beating four German teams along the way, two from West Germany (Eintracht Frankfurt and the Gladbacher) and two from the DDR (Dynamo Dresden, who they also beat twice in later years, and BFC Dynamo). Borussia eliminated an English club in 1979 en route to winning the UEFA Cup for the second time in their history. The English club was Manchester City whose manager, Malcolm Allison, had taken over a few months earlier from Tony Book.

There were memorable encounters in the other European competitions. Borussia Dortmund's wins over holders West Ham United and Liverpool (final in Glasgow) in the 1965–66 European Cup Winners' Cup were memorable as were West Ham's win over TSV 1860 Munich at Wembley Stadium in the final of the same competition a year earlier, Everton's semi final elimination of Bayern in 1985 (they went on to win the Cup Winners Cup and the league) and Gianluca Vialli's Chelsea's win over VfB Stuttgart in the final of 1998. Memorable Anglo-German encounters in the UEFA Cup include Ipswich Town's victories both home and away over 1. FC Köln in the semifinal of the 1981 competition which they won, Tottenham Hotspur's 5–1 aggregate defeat of Cologne in the 1974 competition and defeat of Bayern Munich ten years later when winning the competition for the second time, debutant Watford's comeback against Kaiserslautern in the first round of the 1983–84 competition, Bayern's thrashing of Nottingham Forest 7–2 on aggregate – after Forest had held Bayern to a 1–1 draw in the first leg in Munich – in 1996 en route to winning the cup, debutant Norwich City's win at the Olympiastadion in Munich before ousting Bayern at Carrow Road in 1993 and Kaiserslautern's late turn around against Tottenham Hotspur, managed by George Graham, in 1999.

In 2009, Hamburg eliminated Manchester City who had earlier in the campaign beaten Schalke in Germany, a team they also beat 5–1 in the quarter finals of the 1969–70 European Cup Winners' Cup which City went on to win. Reinhard Libuda played for Schalke at that time (1969–70) while City had the famous trio of Francis Lee, Colin Bell and Mike Summerbee. The English hold the upper hand even in these competitions. There were however some narrow escapes. Liverpool won their 1973 UEFA Cup Final first leg at Anfield 3–0 only for Borussia Mönchengladbach to pull back to 3–2 on aggregate by half-time. The Reds hung on in the second half. In 1976, Queens Park Rangers, also making their debut, with Stan Bowles, Dave Thomas and Don Givens in their ranks, took a 3–0 lead to the Muengersdorf Stadion in Cologne and increased their lead there only for the Germans to storm back with four goals and miss out on qualification on the away goals rule.

There were also many encounters between English league sides and clubs from East Germany which mostly ended in favour of the English sides, although these confrontations were less spectacular than those involving clubs from West Germany. Newport County, then from the English third division but representing Wales in the European Cup Winners' Cup in 1981, went tantalisingly close to eliminating FC Carl Zeiss Jena after a 2–2 draw in East Germany, but lost 0–1 in the home leg. FC Carl Zeiss Jena made it to the final where they lost to Dynamo Tbilisi from Georgia, which was ten part of the Soviet Union. Liverpool had three confrontations with Dynamo Dresden which they all won, including a 5–1 performance at Anfield in the second round of the 1977–78 European Cup. Title holders Nottingham Forest faced BFC Dynamo under Jürgen Bogs in the quarter-finals of the 1979–80 European Cup. Nottingham Forrest lost the first leg at the City Ground 0–1, to one goal by Hans-Jürgen Riediger. The victory against Nottingham Forrest away made BFC Dynamo the first German team to defeat an English team in England in the European Cup. Nottingham Forest defeated BFC Dynamo 3–1 in front of 30,000 spectators at the Friedrich-Ludwig-Jahn-Stadion in East Berlin. Forest under Brian Clough then went on to defeat Ajax and Hamburger SV to retain the trophy.

A different Nottingham Forest side, still managed by Brian Clough, would eventually see off another East German team, FC Vorwärts Frankfurt, in the first round of the 1983–84 UEFA Cup. BFC Dynamo suffered another home defeat (1–2) to an English team, Aston Villa, in the second round of the 1981–82 European Cup. BFC Dynamo managed to register another victory on English soil in the return leg, with one goal by Frank Terletzki, only to be eliminated on the away goal rule. Aston Villa went on to keep the European Cup in England for a sixth consecutive year, after defeated FC Bayern Munich in the Rotterdam final. Forest cast-away, Peter Withe, scored the only goal of the game against the run of play. For most of the second half, Bayern were camped inside the Villa half, hitting the woodwork and coming close to scoring on a number of occasions, but found substitute rookie goalkeeper, Nigel Spink (who replaced veteran Jimmy Rimmer after only a few minutes), in inspiring form.

In the 2015–16 UEFA Champions League, Bayern Munich defeated Arsenal 5–1 in the group stage. In the next year's competition they met again in the round of 16, where Bayern repeated the scoreline home and away for a 10–2 aggregate victory. On 1 October 2019, Bayern thrashed Tottenham Hotspur 7–2 win in a 2019–20 UEFA Champions League match.

Players
The rivalry between the two nations has not prevented their respective nationals from playing in each other's domestic leagues, in certain cases to high renown. Many German players have played in England, including Max Seeburg (who played for Chelsea, Tottenham Hotspur, Burnley, Grimsby Town and Reading), Bert Trautmann (Manchester City), Jürgen Klinsmann (Tottenham Hotspur), Christian Ziege (Liverpool, Middlesbrough and Tottenham Hotspur), Karlheinz Riedle (Liverpool and Fulham), Fredi Bobic (Bolton Wanderers), Dietmar Hamann (Newcastle United, Liverpool and Manchester City), Uwe Rösler, Eike Immel and Maurizio Gaudino (Manchester City), Markus Babbel (Liverpool), Jürgen Röber (Nottingham Forest) Robert Huth (Chelsea, Middlesbrough, Stoke City and Leicester City), Thomas Hitzlsperger and Stefan Beinlich (Aston Villa), Jens Lehmann (Arsenal), Moritz Volz (Arsenal, Fulham and Ipswich Town), Sascha Riether (Fulham), Michael Ballack (Chelsea), Mesut Özil (Arsenal), Per Mertesacker (Arsenal), Lukas Podolski (Arsenal), Jérôme Boateng (Manchester City), Bastian Schweinsteiger (Manchester United), İlkay Gündoğan (Manchester City) and Leroy Sané (Manchester City).

Trautmann was voted Football Writers' Association Footballer of the Year in 1956 for continuing to play in goal for Manchester City in the 1956 FA Cup Final despite a neck injury. Klinsmann was voted the same accolade in 1995 while playing for Tottenham, where he pioneered the 'diving' goal celebration.

Fewer Englishmen have played in Germany, with notable players being Kevin Keegan (Hamburger SV), David Watson (Werder Bremen), Tony Woodcock (1. FC Cologne and SC Fortuna Köln), Michael Mancienne (Hamburg), Jadon Sancho and Jude Bellingham (both Borussia Dortmund), Reiss Nelson (Hoffenheim) and Reece Oxford (Augsburg). Owen Hargreaves played for Bayern Munich for seven seasons before transferring to Manchester United in 2007. Keegan was twice European Footballer of the Year and a European Cup finalist during his time at Hamburg, where the German public nicknamed him "Mighty Mouse", after a cartoon hero, because of his prolific scoring, his short stature, his high level of mobility, and his ability to turn sharply and often while running at high speed. Woodcock was also a popular figure at Cologne.

See also
Argentina–England football rivalry
England–Ireland football rivalry
England–Scotland football rivalry
English football club rivalries
France–Germany football rivalry
Germany–Italy football rivalry
Germany–Netherlands football rivalry
German football rivalries

References

External links
Article detailing 10 famous England v Germany matches
Football and the Battle of Britain – analysis of Anglo-German football rivalry
England v Germany 2010 Pre-Match
England v Germany: The results in full at The Observer 
England-Germany matches 1908-2017 at RSSSF

 
International association football rivalries
England national football team rivalries
Germany national football team rivalries
Football
England at the 1966 FIFA World Cup
England at the 1970 FIFA World Cup
England at the 1990 FIFA World Cup
England at the 2002 FIFA World Cup
England at the 2010 FIFA World Cup
England at UEFA Euro 1996
England at UEFA Euro 2000
England at UEFA Euro 2020
West Germany at the 1966 FIFA World Cup
West Germany at the 1970 FIFA World Cup
West Germany at the 1990 FIFA World Cup
Germany at the 2002 FIFA World Cup
Germany at the 2010 FIFA World Cup
Germany at UEFA Euro 1996
Germany at UEFA Euro 2000
Germany at UEFA Euro 2020
Football hooliganism in the United Kingdom